The Economic Club of Washington, D.C. is a non-profit, non-partisan member-based organization that offers a forum where global leaders can share insights about major issues of the day to the community of the Washington area’s leading executives.

History 
Founded in 1986, The Economic Club of Washington, D.C.'s stated purpose was to form a group that would serve to recognize the unique and critical role that Washington plays in the world economy and of the area’s increasing economic diversity and importance as a center of business activity. Under the steady leadership of its first President, Robert Linowes, the Economic Club quickly established itself in its first six years as an eminent forum for the exchange of information about critical public policy issues. Harry C. McPherson, the Economic Club's second president from 1992-1999, continued on the course established by Mr. Linowes of measured growth and top-echelon speakers, which included First Lady Hillary Rodham Clinton, among other notable featured guests. When former Senator George J. Mitchell succeeded Mr. McPherson as President of the Economic Club from 1999-2004, he appointed a planning group composed of several members who were charged with developing a new strategic plan. The strategic plan the group developed led to the adoption of new and improved communications methods and streamlined management processes. Following Senator Mitchell's term, Vernon Jordan, serving as President from 2004-2008, further enhanced the caliber of speakers regularly appearing at Economic Club meetings. Under his leadership, the Club achieved a major milestone when President George W. Bush appeared as a speaker in October 2005, the first time a sitting President had addressed the Club.

Club Chairman 
David M. Rubenstein is a co-founder and co-executive chairman of The Carlyle Group, one of the world’s largest private equity firms. Since he became chairman in 2008, Economic Club membership more than doubled from 425 to over 950 and the number of meetings held each season has grown from an average of 4 or 5 to as many as 12 to 14. Rubenstein also contributes nearly $1 million annually to the David M. Rubenstein/Economic Club of Washington, D.C. Scholarship Program, which provides nearly 50 students attending public schools and public charter schools in the District of Columbia with college scholarships.

Events and Speakers

Signature Events 

The Economic Club hosts ten to twelve signature speaker events each year, generally organized around a breakfast, lunch, or dinner.  An average of 400 members and guests attend these meetings with some events surpassing 800. This audience is augmented by members of Congress, other U.S. political leaders, and serving Ambassadors from countries all over the world who regularly attend these events. Featured speakers in recent years have included the Presidents of the United States, Colombia, and Panama; the Prime Ministers of Finland, Israel and Singapore; a former Prime Minister of Great Britain; Speakers of the U.S. House of Representatives; heads of the Federal Reserve Board; every Secretary of the Treasury since 1986; other Cabinet members and government officials; and leaders of Fortune Global 100 corporations.

Executive Conversations 
These are smaller group gatherings attended by approximately 30-75 Economic Club members. The more intimate setting allows for greater interaction between speakers and Club members in the exploration of subjects of compelling interest to the United States’ business community. These forums typically are closed to the media.

Global Executive Conversations 

Similar to Executive Conversations, these smaller group gatherings allow for greater interaction between speakers and Club members on international topics, including foreign relations and intercontinental business. Speakers in recent history have included various ambassadors as well as foreign heads of state.

Global Initiative 
The goal of the Global Initiative is to expand interaction between political and business leaders from other nations with the political, diplomatic, and opinion-leading business community in Washington, D.C., and the surrounding area, with an emphasis on economic development.  The Economic Club weaves the Global Initiative into existing programming – notably the Signature Speaker Series and Global Executive Conversation Series.

Member-Hosted Dinners 
Twice a year, up to ten Club members host 130+ members for small group dinners. The participating members are dispersed among the hosts’ homes and offices throughout the Washington Metro region. These gatherings, generally 10 to 20 members, provide an informal opportunity to participate in topic-driven discussion.

Education Initiatives 
The Economic Club of Washington, D.C. manages six inter-related education initiatives that provide scholarships, internships, mentoring, alumni engagement, academic enrichment opportunities, and doctoral fellowships to high school and college students.

The cornerstone of the education initiatives is the David M. Rubenstein/Economic Club of Washington, D.C. Scholarship, which is awarded to college-bound graduates of DC public and public charter high schools. Nearly 50 scholars each receive $20,000 to cover costs over four years of college, totaling around $1 million in scholarships per year. Now in its thirteenth year, this program, endowed by Rubenstein, has awarded over $8.6 million to 602 scholars.

The Economic Club also awards $30,000 in fellowships to students pursuing doctoral degrees. The Philip M. Dearborn Fellowship and two fellowships named in honor of past Economic Club president Vernon E. Jordan, Jr., are presented to doctoral candidates pursuing degrees in the fields of economics, finance, and business. Each of the three fellowships awards the recipient $10,000.

References

External links 

 

501(c)(3) organizations
Non-profit organizations based in Washington, D.C.